Alastair Donald Mackintosh "Sandy" Gunn (27 September 1919 – 6 April 1944), was a Scottish Supermarine Spitfire photo reconnaissance pilot who was taken prisoner during the Second World War.  Gunn took part in the "Great Escape" from Stalag Luft III in March 1944, and was one of the men re-captured and subsequently executed by the Gestapo.

Pre-war life
Gunn was born at home in Auchterarder, Perthshire, the son of surgeon James Turner Gunn, MB, ChB, FRCS and Adelaide Lucy Frances [nee Macdonald] Gunn.  He was reportedly a fine athlete at school, being a member of 1st XV rugby & 1st XI cricket team. He attended Cargilfield Preparatory School and Fettes College, both in Edinburgh, and was a school prefect.  After leaving school, Gunn became an engineering apprentice at the Govan, Glasgow shipyard of Harland and Wolff.  After a year he gained entry to Pembroke College, Cambridge to study mechanical sciences hoping for a career as a diesel engineer.

Early war service

Gunn enlisted in the Royal Air Force on 22 February 1940 and commenced active service on 22 June 1940 as an aircrew candidate (airman 2nd class).

He began his flying training at RAF Ansty near Coventry, and later at Blackpool.

On 18 January 1941 he received his pilot's brevet and promotion to sergeant.  He was commissioned as a Pilot Officer on 25 January 1941.  Gunn subsequently joined No. 48 Squadron RAF of RAF Coastal Command flying Avro Anson aircraft on photo reconnaissance missions.  A reliable record flying with the squadron led to Gunn being posted to RAF Benson to fly stripped-down high-altitude conversion Supermarine Spitfires with the RAF in September 1941. In January 1942 he was posted to RAF Wick in the north of Scotland. Wick was a noted photo reconnaissance aerodrome: for example, in May 1941, a Spitfire from Wick found and photographed the German battleship Bismarck in a Norwegian fjord. Bismarck was later sunk by the Royal Navy, but the German battleship Tirpitz remained a threat in Norway.

Gunn was promoted to Flying Officer on 25 January 1942, and flew many long-range missions over German naval units on the Norwegian coast and in the North Atlantic, often in terrible weather conditions. On one occasion he crashed in the North Atlantic after his aircraft ran out of fuel.

Prisoner of war
At 0807 hours on the morning of 5 March 1942, Gunn took off from RAF Wick in a Supermarine Spitfire on a photo reconnaissance mission of the German naval anchorages on the Norwegian coastline near Trondheim, Norway. He was shot down with burn on hands and face by two Messerschmitt Bf 109s from Jagdgruppe Losigkeit, flown by Leutnants Heinz Knoke and Dieter Gerhard.  Gunn bailed out before his Spitfire crashed near Langurda, Surnadal, Norway, and was made a prisoner of war.

Gunn was initially suspected by the Germans of having flown from a covert RAF base somewhere in northern Norway. He was questioned over a period of three weeks before being processed into the prison camp system.   Gunn was sent to Stalag Luft III in the German province of Lower Silesia near the town of Sagan (now Żagań, Poland), where he became a regular member of the tunnelling team.  In captivity, Gunn was promoted to Flight Lieutenant (24 January 1943).

The 'Great Escape'

Gunn was one of 76 men who escaped the prison camp on the night of 24–25 March 1944 in the now famous "Great Escape".  The alarms sounded upon the discovery of the escape attempt when he had been outside the wire for less than an hour.  Gunn was quickly arrested on the road to Görlitz (to the south of the camp), and arrived at the collection point for recaptured officers at Görlitz prison.

The prisoners were interrogated harshly. Mike Casey and Gunn were both told that they would lose their heads.  At Görlitz prison on the morning of 6 April 1944, Tony Bethell heard a truck arrive and saw three Germans in uniform call out the names of Denys Street, Neville McGarr, Jack Grisman, Sandy Gunn, Harold Milford, and John F Williams.

Outcome
Gunn was one of 50 escapees executed by the Gestapo.  He was cremated at Breslau.  Originally his remains were buried at Sagan, although his ashes are now interred in the Old Garrison Cemetery, Poznan.

Gunn's name was amongst those in the list of the murdered prisoners, which was published in the press in the UK and Commonwealth countries when news broke on or about 20 May 1944.

See Stalag Luft III murders

Post-war investigations saw a number of those guilty of the murders tracked down, arrested, and tried for their crimes; some were executed.

In 2018, wreckage of Gunn's aircraft was found in a peat bog near the Norwegian village of Surnadal and brought back to the UK.

Awards
Mentioned in Despatches on 5 June 1942 for service as pilot officer
Mentioned in Despatches for conspicuous gallantry as a prisoner of war

References 
Notes

Bibliography

External links
 Lessons from History site analyses their efforts using modern project management methods, as the prisoners formally structured their work as a project.

Further reading
 Project Lessons from the Great Escape (Stalag Luft III), by Mark Kozak-Holland.

1919 births
1944 deaths
People educated at Cargilfield School
People educated at Fettes College
Royal Air Force officers
British World War II pilots
World War II prisoners of war held by Germany
Royal Air Force personnel killed in World War II
Participants in the Great Escape from Stalag Luft III
British escapees
Extrajudicial killings in World War II
British World War II prisoners of war
People from Perthshire
Shot-down aviators
Scottish airmen